The grey-tailed piha (Snowornis subalaris) is a species of bird in the family Cotingidae. It is found in Colombia, Ecuador and Peru where its natural habitat is subtropical or tropical moist montane forests.

Description
Both sexes have a dull grey head with a narrow, pale yellow ring of bare skin surrounding the eye. The upper parts are olive-green with a greyish rump and a plain grey tail. The underparts are pale olive green with lighter streaks and a pale grey belly. The underwing coverts are pale yellow. This bird could be confused with the olivaceous piha (Snowornis cryptolophus), but it has a yellower belly and an olive rather than a grey tail.

Distribution and habitat
It is generally a rare or uncommon bird and is found in the middle and lower parts of the canopy. It is an elusive bird, remaining still for long periods and blending in with the branches. It is usually solitary, but may occasionally join a mixed species foraging group. It feeds mainly on insects, but may also consume fruits, sometimes flying out from its perch, where it sits unmoving for long periods, to catch an insect in the air or hover to glean insects from foliage.

Status
Because of current and future deforestation in the Amazon Basin, the population is expected to decline by 25-30% over the next three generations, causing this species to be listed as near threatened.

References

grey-tailed piha
Birds of the Colombian Andes
Birds of the Ecuadorian Andes
Birds of the Peruvian Andes
grey-tailed piha
grey-tailed piha
Taxonomy articles created by Polbot